Aleksandr Yevgenyevich Shchanitsin (born 2 December 1984) is a Russian former professional footballer.

Club career
Shchanitsyn made his professional debut in the Russian Second Division in 2003 for FC Tekstilshchik Ivanovo. He made his Russian Premier League debut for PFC Spartak Nalchik on 13 March 2010 in a game against FC Anzhi Makhachkala.

Career statistics

References

1984 births
Living people
Sportspeople from Ivanovo
Russian footballers
Association football midfielders
FC Ural Yekaterinburg players
PFC Spartak Nalchik players
Russian Premier League players
FC Tekstilshchik Ivanovo players